Orthaea may refer to:
 , mythological Greek character
 Orthaea (bug), a genus of true bugs in the family Rhyparochromidae
 Orthaea (plant), a genus of plants in the family Ericaceae
 Orthaea, a genus of beetles in the family Chrysomelidae, synonym of Euphitrea